Nahed Sherif, (1 January 1942 – 7 April 1981) was an Egyptian actress who came to prominence in Egyptian and Lebanese films of the 1960s and 1970s.

Biography
Born Samiha Zaki El-Nial and a Lycée Français du Caire dropout, she was discovered by director Hussein Helmy El-Mohandess and made her debut in 1958. In 1961, she married El-Mohandess and he directed two films offering her starring roles opposite leading actor Salah Zulfikar in the romance, A Storm of Love (عاصفة من الحب), Me and my Daughters (أنا وبناتي), earning commercial success for both films. Her marriage with El-Mohandess lasted for a brief period and she later married fellow actor Kamal El-Shennawi.

While married to El-Shennawy, she was paired with Salah Zulfikar for the third time in Virgo (برج العذراء) and for the fourth time in the crime-thriller The Killers (القتلة), both films were box-office hits. After divorce with El-Shennawi, Sherif moved to Lebanon and made her Lebanese film debut with 1973 action film Kuwait Connection directed by Sami A. Khouri who reached fame with The Lady of the Black Moons. She later starred in a number of other Lebanese films and married Lebanese Armenian Edward Gergian. She was paired with Salah Zulfikar for the fifth and last time in the commercial hit; Desire and Price (الرغبة والثمن). She was diagnosed with breast cancer in late 1970s and died in 1981.

References

External links
Nahied Sherif at ElCinema
 

Egyptian film actresses
1942 births
1981 deaths
People from Alexandria
20th-century Egyptian actresses